José Luis Monteiro (1848–1942) was a Portuguese architect. His work is considered among the most influential within late 19th century architecture.

Life 
José Luis Monteiro was born in Lisbon, Portugal on 25 October 1848. At age 12, Monteiro enrolled in the Royal Academy of Fine Arts in Lisbon. In 1873 he moved to Paris to attend the École nationale supérieure des Beaux-Arts in Paris, completing his degree under the mentorship of Jean Louis-Pascal in 1879. 

In 1880, Monteiro returned to Portugal where he assumed a role as chief architect for the Lisbon City Council, in addition to a teaching position at the city's Royal Academy of Fine Arts, where he originally trained. In 1901 he was awarded the Legion of Honor.

Monteiro died on 27 January 1942 in Campo de Ourique, Portugal.

Work 
Monteiro utilized a number of different architectural styles including Neoclassicism and French Second Empire. He is most well known for his revolutionary use of metal in the interior Rossio Railway Station; the building contained one of the first iron vaults in the nation.

Notable projects 

 Hôtel de Ville (reconstruction), Paris, 1874
 Rossio Railway Station, Lisbon, 1886
Liceu Nacional Passos Manuel, Lisbon, 1881
 Hotel Avenida Palace, Lisbon, 1890
 Igreja dos Anjos, Lisbon, 1908

References 

1848 births
1942 deaths
19th-century architects
20th-century Portuguese architects